aaajiao, is the online handle of Xu Wenkai,  a Shanghai- and Berlin-based artist, avid blogger and free thinker.

Born in 1984, aaajiao grew up in Xi'an. Being one of the most frequently exhibited Chinese new media artists, aaajiao has been featured in both international and domestic scenes. Highlights include: “Global Control And Censorship - ZKM | Zentrum für Kunst und Medientechnologie Karlsruhe, Karlsruhe(2015)”, The 2nd “CAFAM Future” Exhibition: Observer-Creator · The Reality Representation of Chinese Young Art Beijing, CAFA Art Museum (2015); Cosmos - Limited and Limitless, Existence and Co-existence Shanghai, 21st Century Minsheng Art Museum (2014), Thingworld - International Triennial of New Media Art Beijing, The National Art Museum of China (2014), The West Bund Architecture and Contemporary Art Biennale, Shanghai (2013); “One World” Exposition – Chinese Art in the Age of the New Media, Videotage, TransLife: Media Art China 2011 - International Triennial of New Media Art Beijing, The National Art Museum of China (2011), Hong Kong (2011); Transmediale, Berlin (2010), etc. aaajiao is a winner of the Jury Prize from Art Sanya Awards 2014, a nominee of OCAT – Pierre Huber Art Prize, and most recently, a nominee of the “Young Artist of the Year” of 9th “Award of Art China”.

Selected solo exhibitions 

2020 Deep Simulator, Turin Castello di Rivoli
2020 URL is LOVE – A Digital Retrospective, Cyberspace, Tabula Rasa Gallery
2020 Cave Simulator, May 2020, Shanghai, Aike
2019 a‘a’a‘jiao: an ID, Shanghai, HOW Art Museum 
2018 bot, 8 Berlin, House of Egorn 
2017 User, Love, High-frequency Trading, Shanghai, Leo Xu Projects
2016 Remnants of an Electronic Past, Centre for Chinese Contemporary Art, Manchester
2016 Remnants of an Electronic Past, OCAT Xi'an
2015 aaajiao – Untitled, Beijing, Gallery Yang
2015 Alias: aaajiao, Shanghai, Leo Xu Projects
2014 The Screen Generation @ 9m² -Museum, Shanghai, 9m² Museum ( Goethe Open Space)
2013 The Screen Generation, Shanghai, chi K11 art space
2013 The Screen Generation – Prequel Nov 2013 Beijing, C-Space
2011 Placebo, Shanghai, OtherGallery
2010 Cybernetics, Shanghai, V Arts Centre

Selected group exhibitions 
2020 PLAYER OF BEINGS, Ming Contemporary Art Museum, Shanghai 
2020 Immaterial/Re-material: A Brief History of Computing Art UCCA Center for Contemporary Art Beijing 
2020 Ars Electronica In Kepler's Gardens -A global journey mapping the ‘new’ world, Linz
2020 Facing the Collector. The Sigg Collection of Contemporary Art from China Castello di Rivoli Museum of Contemporary Art, Turin
2019 The Return of Guests – Selections from the PSA Collection Shanghai Contemporary Art Museum, Power Station of art, Shanghai
2019 A.I. Goooooooooogle infiltration Efremidis gallery, Berlin
2019 I Sing the Body Electric David Zwirner Gallery, HongKong 
2019 Afterimage: Dangdai Yishu Lisson Gallery, London 
2019 13th Cairo Biennale, Egypt
2019 Artificial Intelligence and Intercultural Dialogue, The State Hermitage Museum, Saint Petersburg 
2019 Chinese Whispers – Neue Kunst aus der Sigg Collection, Museum für Angewandte Kunst (MAK), Vienna
2018 Art in the Age of the Internet, 1989 to Today, University of Michigan Museum of Art, Michigan 
2019 Bad Code, Power Station of art, Shanghai 
2018 GLOBAL CONTROL AND CENSORSHIP, MODEM, Debrecen
2018 GLOBAL CONTROL AND CENSORSHIP, The National Library of Latvia, Latvia 
2018 Brilliant City (Reprise), David Zwirner Gallery, HongKong
2018 GLOBAL CONTROL AND CENSORSHIP, The National Library of Technology, Prag
2018 Take Me (I'm yours) Villa Medici, Rome
2018 Chinese Medicine in America: Converging Ideas, People, and Practices, New York, The Museum of Chinese in America
2018 Art in the Age of the Internet, 1989 to Today, Institute of Contemporary Art Boston, Boston
2017 GLOBAL CONTROL AND CENSORSHIP, Estonia, Tallinna Kunstihoone
2017 Body Media II, Shanghai, Power Station of Art
2017 Shanghai Project Chapter 2 Exhibition: Seeds of Time, Shanghai, Himalayas Museum
2017 All Happens after Sunset..., Shanghai, MoCA Pavilion
2017 Create Spaces, Chengdu, Luxelakes·A4 Art Museum
2017 Moments and More: Documents of Culture Pavilion [wén huà guǎn] Online Art Project, Shanghai, OCAT
2017 Nominations, Three Rooms – International Touring Exhibition of Young Media Artists, Shanghai, Chronus Art Center
2016 A Strong Gale in the Dark Forest, Caochangdi, Chuangxinyi Internet Bar, Three Supermarkets, Beijing
2016 The 3rd Shenzhen Independent Animation Biennale, Shenzhen
2016 Temporal Turn: Art and Speculation in Contemporary Asia, Spencer Museum of Art, Kansas, USA
2016 "Ethics of Technology" Beijing Media Art Biennale, Beijing
2016 OVERPOP, Shanghai, Yuz Museum
2016 Take Me (I'm Yours) New York, Jewish Museum
2016 The Exhibition of Annual of Contemporary Art of China, Beijing, Minsheng Art Museum
2016 The Mud of Compound Experience, G/F, No. 98 Apliu Street, Kowloon, Hong Kong
2016 HACK SPACE, Hong Kong, K11 Art Foundation Pop-up Space
2016 Heavy Artillery, Australia, Rabbit Gallery
2015 Globale: Global Control And Censorship – ZKM | Zentrum für Kunst und Medientechnologie Karlsruhe, Karlsruhe
2015 Fusion: Chinese Modern And Contemporary Art Since 1930s Wuhan, Wanlin Art Museum of Wuhan University
2015 Frieze New York Frame, New York
2015 The 2nd “CAFAM Future” Exhibition: Observer-Creator · The Reality Representation of Chinese Young Art, HongKong, K11
2015 The Tell-Tale Heart, Chi Art Space, Hong Kong
2015 The 2nd “CAFAM Future” Exhibition: Observer-Creator · The Reality Representation of Chinese Young Art, Beijing, CAFA Art Museum
2014 2014 OCAT – Pierre Huber Art Prize Shortlist Exhibition The Truth About Entropy Shanghai, OCAT Contemporary Art Terminal, Shanghai
2014 Cosmos – Limited and Limitless, Existence and Co-existence Shanghai, 21st Century Minsheng Art Museum
2014 The 12th National Art Exhibition – Experimental Art, Beijing, Today Art Museum
2014 Metamorphosis of the Virtual 5+5, Shanghai, chi K11 art museum
2014 Silence – the 1990s, Paris, Balice Hertling
2014 Thingworld – International Triennial of New Media Art, Beijing, The National Art Museum of China
2014 PANDAMONIUM – Media Art From, Shanghai Berlin, Momentum
2014 Transience – Intractable Objects, Beijing, Taikang Space
2013 The West Bank Architecture and Contemporary Art Biennale, Shanghai
2013 Reading Shanghai, Leo Xu Projects
2013 Lost In The Labyrinth, New York, Harvestworks
2013 Truth, Beauty, Freedom and Money – Art After Social Media Era, Shanghai, chi K11 art space
2013 SHANGHAI SURPRISE – A GROUP SHOW ON CONTEMPORARY ART IN SHANGHAI, Shanghai, chi K11 art space

References

External links 
 

 aaajiao - eventstructure
 ArtLinkArt
 aaajiao (Xu Wenkai) | ZKM
 LEO XU PROJECTS » news | AAAJIAO AT ZKM CENTER FOR ART AND MEDIA
 Aaajiao (Xu Wenkai)
 Aaajiao 徐文愷 - 23 Artworks, Bio & Shows on Artsy
 
 Transmediale for refusal
 Opening Doors in China for Creations Old and New

Artists from Xi'an
Living people
Chinese contemporary artists
1984 births